Vadodara - Kota Passenger is a passenger train of the Indian Railways, which runs between Kota Junction railway station in Rajasthan and Vadodara Junction railway station in Gujarat. It is currently being operated with 59831/59832 train numbers on a weekly basis.

Average speed and frequency 

The 59831/Vadodara Kota Passenger runs with an average speed of 35 km/h and completes 527 km in 15h. The 59832/Kota Vadodara Passenger runs with an average speed of 34 km/h and completes 527 km in 15h 40m.

Route & Halts 

The important halts of the train are:

Coach composite 

The train has standard LHB rakes with max speed of 130 kmph. The train consists of 11 coaches:

 1 Chair Car
 7 General
 2 Generators cum Luggage/parcel van

Traction

Both trains are hauled by a Vadodara based WAP 4E locomotive from Kota to Vadodara and vice versa.

See also 

 Kota Junction railway station
 Vadodara Junction railway station
 Vadodara - Dahod MEMU
 Dahod - Ratlam MEMU

Notes

References

External links 

 59831/Vadodara Kota Passenger
 59832/Kota Vadodara Passenger

Transport in Kota, Rajasthan
Transport in Vadodara
Rail transport in Gujarat
Rail transport in Rajasthan
Rail transport in Madhya Pradesh
Slow and fast passenger trains in India